Hrabušice is a village and municipality in the Spišská Nová Ves District in the Košice Region of central-eastern Slovakia. Hrabušice is the starting point for the walks through Slovak karst region. Tourism is a major local employer here.

History
The village was first mentioned in local records in 1279. It contains the 13th century Church of St. Laurence, and the ruins of a Carthusian monastery, built about 1305 on the site of a refuge used during the period of the Tatar invasions.

Geography
The village lies at an altitude of 548 metres and covers an area of 40.886 km². In 2011 Hrabušice had a population of about 2,378 inhabitants.

Genealogical resources

The records for genealogical research are available at the state archive "Statny Archiv in Levoca, Slovakia"

 Roman Catholic church records (births/marriages/deaths): 1703-1903 (parish A)
 Lutheran church records (births/marriages/deaths): 1788-1910 (parish B)

See also
 List of municipalities and towns in Slovakia

References

External links
Municipal website
Surnames of living people in Hrabusice

Villages and municipalities in Spišská Nová Ves District